Kasi Viswanatha Temple may refer to:

Kasi Viswanath Temple, the jyothirlinga in Varanasi, Uttar Pradesh, India
Kasi Viswanathar temple, Tenkasi, a temple in Tenkasi, Tirunelveli district, Tamil Nadu, India
Kasi Viswanathar Temple, Kumbakonam, a temple in Kumbakonam, Tamil Nadu, India
Kasi Viswanatha Temple, West Mambalam, a temple in West Mambalam, Chennai, Tamil Nadu, India
Kasi Viswanatha Temple, Ayanavaram, a temple in West Mambalam, Chennai, Tamil Nadu, India
Kasi Viswanathar Temple, Umayalpuram, a temple in Ayanavaram, Tamil Nadu, India
Kunnuvarankottai Kasi Visalakshi-Viswanathar Temple, a temple in Kunnuvarkottai, Tamil Nadu, India